The 1950 NCAA Men's Ice Hockey Tournament was the culmination of the 1949–50 NCAA men's ice hockey season, the 3rd such tournament in NCAA history. It was held between March 16 and 18, 1950, and concluded with Colorado College defeating Boston University 13–4. All games were played at the Broadmoor Ice Palace in Colorado Springs, Colorado.

The 13 goals Colorado College scored in the championship game is a record that has been equaled only once (by Colorado College in 1957). Additionally, the 23 goals scored in their two games is a record for one team in a Frozen Four. CC's goal differential (+16) is also a record for an NCAA tournament, matched by Michigan in 1953 and Wisconsin in 1983.

Qualifying teams
Four teams qualified for the tournament, two each from the eastern and western regions. The teams were selected by a committee based upon both their overall record and the strength of their opponents.

Format
The eastern and western teams judged as better were seeded as the top regional teams. The second eastern seed was slotted to play the top western seed and vice versa. All games were played at the Broadmoor Ice Palace. All matches were Single-game eliminations with the semifinal winners advancing to the national championship game and the losers playing in a consolation game.

Bracket

Note: * denotes overtime period(s)

Results

Semifinals

Boston College vs. Colorado College

Michigan vs. Boston University

Consolation Game

Michigan vs. Boston College

Championship Game

Colorado College vs. Boston University

All-Tournament team

First Team
G: Ralph Bevins* (Boston University)
D: Ross Smith (Michigan)
D: Jim Starrak (Colorado College)
F: Bill Anderson (Boston University)
F: Tony Frasca (Colorado College)
F: Jack Garrity (Boston University)
* Most Outstanding Player(s)

Second Team
G: Roy Ikola (Colorado College)
D: Ed Songin (Boston College)
D: Joe Foligno (Boston University)
F: Jack Mulhern (Boston College)
F: Wally Grant (Michigan)
F: Ron Hartwell (Colorado College)

References

Tournament
NCAA Division I men's ice hockey tournament
NCAA Men's Ice Hockey Tournament
NCAA Men's Ice Hockey Tournament
1950s in Colorado Springs, Colorado
Ice hockey competitions in Colorado Springs, Colorado